The Yukon Legislative Building is home to the Yukon Legislative Assembly. Located in Whitehorse, Yukon, the building is a three-storey white steel-clad structure. The complex is located next to the Yukon River and Rotary Park.

History
Before relocating to Whitehorse, the legislature met at the Yukon Territorial Government Administration Building in Dawson City from 1907 to 1953 (now home to a satellite campus of Yukon University). From 1953 to 1976 the Legislature sat in Whitehorse, first at the Old Post Office (Government Services Building built in 1901 and demolished in 1962), then in the Federal Building (demolished in 1990s), then in the Lynn Building on Steele Street.  In 1976, the legislature moved to its current location in the new territorial administration building which was opened on Tuesday, May 25, by Jules Leger, the Governor-General of Canada.

Tenants

The building houses most of Yukon Government's departments and is the home of the Legislature Assembly. 
Both the Legislative Assembly and Executive Council sit in the same chamber.

References

External links 
Yukon Territorial Government administration building
Government Building

Legislative buildings in Canada
Buildings and structures in Whitehorse
Politics of Yukon
Legislature of Yukon
Government buildings completed in 1976
1976 establishments in Yukon